Grace Byers (née Gealey; born July 26, 1984) is a Caymanian actress, known for her role as Anika Calhoun in the Fox music-industry drama, Empire.

Early life
Grace was born in Butler, Pennsylvania July 26, 1984, and raised in the Cayman Islands from infancy. She knows sign language due to having deaf parents. After moving to the United States, she received her bachelor's degree in Theater Arts at the University of South Florida in Tampa. Grace later attended the University of California, Irvine, where she received her Master’s of Fine Arts in acting.

Career
Byers then moved to New York City, where she performed Off-Broadway, including in Venus Flytrap: A Femme Noir Mystery, and  Rent. In 2013, she performed in the Chicago productions of The Misanthrope and Tartuffe. In 2014, Gealey was cast as Anika Calhoun in the Fox musical prime time drama, Empire opposite Terrence Howard and Taraji P. Henson. The series debuted on January 7, 2015. She left the series after four seasons in 2018.

In 2017, Byers was cast as Kate, a jazz singer and lounge owner, in the indie thriller Bent. In 2018, Byers published a children's book titled I Am Enough, based on her experiences being bullied as a child for having deaf parents. She wrote it to empower children to love and accept themselves.

From 2018 to 2019, Byers starred as Reeva Payge in the Fox superhero series The Gifted. In 2021, she began starring as Quinn Joseph in the Amazon comedy series, Harlem.

Personal life
Byers became engaged to her Empire costar Trai Byers in 2015. She and Byers married on Grand Cayman, Cayman Islands on April 14, 2016. They are expecting their first child together.

Filmography

Film

Television

Bibliography
I Believe I Can (2020) 9780062667137 
I Am Enough (2018) 9780062667120

References

External links
 

1984 births
Living people
American people of Caymanian descent
American soap opera actresses
American stage actresses
21st-century American actresses
University of South Florida alumni
Caymanian artists
University of California, Irvine alumni
Caymanian emigrants to the United States
People from Butler, Pennsylvania
Actresses from Pittsburgh